Cherno Sowe (born 23 November 1978) is a Gambian sprinter. He competed in the men's 4 × 100 metres relay at the 1996 Summer Olympics.

References

1978 births
Living people
Athletes (track and field) at the 1996 Summer Olympics
Gambian male sprinters
Olympic athletes of the Gambia
Place of birth missing (living people)